Green High School (GHS) is a rural, public high school located in Franklin Furnace, Ohio, United States. It is the only high school in the Green Local School District. The school mascot is the bobcat and the school colors are green and white. The school fight song is adopted originally from Northwestern University, titled "Go Northwestern Go".

History
The current Green High School campus was completed in 1972. In 2018, voters in the school district passed a bond issue to construct a new campus for the schools.

Athletics
There are ten school districts and eleven high schools in Scioto County along with one parochial school as well several private and community schools.  The school's athletic affiliation is with the Ohio High School Athletic Association (OHSAA) and the Southern Ohio Conference (SOC), which has seventeen member schools and is divided into two divisions (SOC I & SOC II) based on the schools' enrollment. The SOC includes teams from four different Ohio counties:

Gallery

References

External links
 

High schools in Scioto County, Ohio
Public high schools in Ohio
1972 establishments in Ohio